Sarayut Kiewprae is a Thai professional footballer. He currently plays for Trat in the Thai League 2.

References 

Living people
Sarayut Kiewprae
1982 births
Sarayut Kiewprae
Association football defenders
Sarayut Kiewprae